Loretta Németh (born 9 December 1995) is a Hungarian footballer who plays as a forward and has appeared for the Hungary women's national team.

Career
Németh has been capped for the Hungary national team, appearing for the team during the 2019 FIFA Women's World Cup qualifying cycle.

References

External links
 
 
 

1995 births
Living people
Hungarian women's footballers
Hungary women's international footballers
Women's association football forwards